Philip Fox may refer to:

Philip Fox (actor), English film and television actor
Philip Fox (astronomer) (1878–1944), American astronomer and U.S. Army officer
Phil Fox (born 1985), American ice hockey player

See also
Philip Fox La Follette (1897–1965), American politician